The following television stations in the United States brand as channel 3 (though neither using virtual channel 3 nor broadcasting on physical RF channel 3):
 KBJR-DT2 in Duluth, Minnesota
 KESE-LD in Yuma, Arizona
 KESQ-TV in Palm Springs, California
 KRII-DT2 in Chisholm, Minnesota
 News-Press 3 NOW in St. Joseph, Missouri
 WMDT-DT2 in Salisbury, Maryland
 WSEE-DT2 in Erie, Pennsylvania

The following television stations in the United States formerly branded as channel 3:
 KNTV in San Francisco, California (O&O)

03 branded